The 2018 Maltese Super Cup was the 34th Maltese Super Cup, an annual football match played between the title holders of the Maltese Premier League and the Maltese FA Trophy. It was contested on 13 December 2018 by Valletta – who won a league and FA Trophy double the previous season – and Balzan, who finished runners-up in the league. Played at the Ta' Qali National Stadium, Valletta won the match 2–1.

This was Balzan's first ever Super Cup final, playing against a Valletta side who won the previous season's league title on the last day following Balzan's defeat. Valletta were looking to winning their third honour for the year, making a return to this cup final after their win in the 2016 final against Sliema Wanderers.

Match

Details

References 

1
2018–19 in European football
2018 in association football
Maltese Super Cup